Jonathan Thomas Coutlangus (born October 21, 1980) is an American baseball assistant coach at North Greenville University.

Previously, he was an outfielder and pitcher for Major League Baseball.

He played college baseball at the University of South Carolina with his current head coach Landon Powell.  Both were part of the Gamecocks' 56–10 season in 2000 and played in Major League Baseball before coaching.

Baseball career

Coutlangus was drafted in the 33rd round of the  amateur draft, but did not sign. In , the San Francisco Giants drafted Coutlangus in the 19th round. Originally drafted as an outfielder, he was batting just .194 in 71 games with the Hagerstown Suns in 2004.  The Suns then converted him to a pitcher.  Coutlangus was claimed off waivers by the Cincinnati Reds on March 31,  and played in the minor leagues with the Chattanooga Lookouts and Louisville Bats.

After being designated for assignment at the end of spring training, Coutlangus was traded to the Diamondbacks on April 7, but never played in the major leagues again.

Coaching career

He is now the pitching coach for the North Greenville University baseball team in Greenville, South Carolina, coached by Powell, and part of the Ray Tanner coaching tree.

References

External links

Cincinnati Reds players
Baseball players from Florida
Louisville Bats players
1980 births
Living people
Major League Baseball pitchers
Indian River State Pioneers baseball players
South Carolina Gamecocks baseball players
Hagerstown Suns players
Tucson Sidewinders players
Reno Aces players
Salem-Keizer Volcanoes players
Arizona League Giants players
San Jose Giants players
Chattanooga Lookouts players
Phoenix Desert Dogs players
North Greenville Crusaders baseball coaches